ICC World Cricket League Division Three forms part of the World Cricket League (WCL) system. Like all other divisions, WCL Division Three is contested as a standalone tournament rather than as an actual league.

The inaugural Division Three tournament was held in 2007, and featured eight teams. All subsequent editions have featured six teams.  Because the WCL operates on a system of promotion and relegation, teams have generally only participated in one or two Division Three tournaments before either being promoted to Division Two or relegated to Division Four. Overall, 18 teams have featured in a Division Three tournament. Uganda has qualified for the division on six out of the seven occasions it has been held, while the United States has qualified on five occasions.

Results

Performance by team
Legend
 – Champions
 – Runners-up
 – Third place
Q – Qualified
    — Hosts
 Sus- Suspended and withdrew

Player statistics

References

Division 3